List of islands within the Murray River in South Australia is a list of islands located within the watercourse of the Murray River within the Australian state of South Australia from the mouth of the river at Encounter Bay in the south to the borders with the states of New South Wales and Victoria in the east including the following lakes located adjacent to the river's mouth - Coorong, Lake Albert and Lake Alexandrina.

Coorong
The following list includes islands (listed from west to east) in the Coorong as well as the following two channels connecting it to Port Pullen at the Murray Mouth - the Coorong Channel and the Tauwitchere Channel.  As of 2014, all of the islands in the following list were within the boundary of the Coorong National Park.

Lake Albert

Lake Alexandrina
The following is a list of islands (from west to east) within Lake Alexandrina and including the group of islands at the southern end of the lake.

Wellington to Morgan
The following is a list of islands (from south to north) within the river’s channel between the town of Wellington and the town of Morgan.

Morgan to the border
The following is a list of islands (from west to east) within the river’s channel between the town of Morgan and the borders with New South Wales and Victoria.

See also
List of islands of Australia
List of islands in lakes

Citations and references

Citations

References 

 
 
 
 
 

.islands
Islands of South Australia
Murray River
islands, Murray River